Joan Gale, born Lorraine Gilmartin, (September 13, 1912 – June 11, 1998) was a vaudeville performer as part of the Gale Sisters and a film actress. She was the twin sister of Jean Gale and performed with a second set of twin sisters (June Gale and Jane Gale) from the same family touring in shows as the Gale Sisters. She appeared in several Mascot Pictures productions.

On Broadway, Gale and her sisters appeared as the Gale Quadruplets in Flying High (1930) and George White's Scandals (1931).

Gale married Lou Schreiber, a casting director for 20th Century Fox. They had a daughter.

Filmography
Outlawed Guns (1935) as Marge Ellsworth
The Miracle Rider (1935), a serial, as Ruth
The Nut Farm (1935) as Agatha Sliscomb
The Blind Date bit part
Hollywood Here We Come (1934) short film 
Blind Date (1934) as Flora
Kiss and Make-Up (1934) as a salon worker
Melody in Spring (1934) as Suzan
Poor Little Rich Boy (1934) short film as part of The Gale Sisters
The Last of the Mohicans (1932 serial) as a Native American maiden

References

1912 births
1998 deaths
Actresses from California
American film actresses
20th-century American actresses
Vaudeville performers
Actresses from San Francisco